The Satellite Award for Outstanding Youth Blu-Ray/DVD is an annual award given by the International Press Academy as one of its Satellite Awards.

Winners and nominees

Outstanding Youth DVD

Outstanding Youth Blu-Ray

References

External links
 International Press Academy website

Blu-Ray Youth